We Live Again is a 1934 film directed by Rouben Mamoulian and starring Anna Sten and Fredric March. The film is an adaptation of Leo Tolstoy's 1899 novel Resurrection (Voskraeseniye). The screenplay was written by Maxwell Anderson with contributions from a number of writers, including Preston Sturges and Thornton Wilder.

Producer Samuel Goldwyn made the film to showcase Ukrainian actress Anna Sten, his newest discovery. It was Goldwyn who named the film "We Live Again", on the theory that it meant the same thing as "Resurrection" and was easier to understand.  The first film adaptation of the Tolstoy novel was made in 1909 by D. W. Griffith, and ran 10 minutes. Numerous other film versions have been made since then.

Plot
Russian Prince Dmitri Nekhlyudov (Fredric March) seduces innocent young Katusha Maslova (Anna Sten), a servant to his aunts.  After they spend the night together in the greenhouse, Dmitri leaves the next morning, outraging Katusha by not leaving a note for her, only money. When she becomes pregnant, she is fired, and when the baby is born, it dies and is buried unbaptized.  Katusha then goes to Moscow, where she falls into a life of prostitution, poverty and degradation.

Dmitri, now engaged to Missy (Jane Baxter), the daughter of the wealthy judge, Prince Kortchagin (C. Aubrey Smith), is called for jury duty in Kotchagin's court for a murder trial. The case is about a merchant who has been killed, and Dmitri is astonished to see that Katusha is one of the defendants. The jury finds that she is guilty of "giving the powder to the merchant Smerkov without intent to rob", but because they neglected to say without intent to kill, even though the jury intended to free her, the judge sentences her to five years hard labor in Siberia.

Feeling guilty about abandoning Katusha years before, and wanting to redeem her and himself as well, the once-callous nobleman attempts to get her released from prison.  He fails in his efforts, so he returns to the prison to ask Katusha to marry him.  He fails in his efforts, so he returns to the prison to ask Katusha to forgive and marry him, which would then help him free her. She refuses, and is furious that he has made her feel again. Katusha's friends think she is a fool to send him away and hold out hope that he will appear again Dmitri frees his serfs, breaks his engagement and follows Katusha to the border of Siberia. This time he will go with her to Siberia where together, they will "live again." This time she accepts him.  When he doesn't show up on the day the prisoners are to be transported, Katusha gives up hope, but then he appears on the border of Siberia where the prisoners are being processed: he has divided his land among his servants and wants to "live again" with her forgiveness, help and love.

Cast
Anna Sten as Katusha Maslova
Fredric March as Prince Dmitri Nekhlyudov
Jane Baxter as Missy Kortchagin
C. Aubrey Smith as Prince Kortchagin
Sam Jaffe as Gregory Simonson
Ethel Griffies as Aunt Marie
Gwendolyn Logan as Aunt Sophia
Jessie Ralph as Matrona Pavlovna
Leonid Kinskey as Simon Kartinkin
Dale Fuller as Botchkova
Morgan Wallace as The Colonel
Crauford Kent as Schonbock
Fritzi Ridgeway as The Redhead

Cast notes:
Samuel Goldwyn had introduced Anna Sten, who he hoped would become the "new Garbo", earlier in 1934 in the film Nana, then showcased her in this film, and tried again in 1935 with The Wedding Night.  None of the three films was a box office success, and Goldwyn released "The Passionate Peasant" from her contract.
This was the first Hollywood film for English actress Jane Baxter.

Production
Unlike many films concerning illicit sex made in the 1930s, We Live Again, which had the working title of "Resurrection", met with the approval of the censors at the Hays Office.  Joseph Breen wrote to Will H. Hays: "Though dealing with a sex affair and its attendant consequences, the story has been handled with such fine emphasis on the moral values of repentance and retribution, as to emerge with a definite spiritual quality. We feel that this picture could, in fact, serve as a model for the proper treatment of the element of illicit sex in pictures."

The film was in production from 12 June to 2 August 1934.  The New York opening took place during the week of 1 November of that year, with the general American release on 16 November.

We Live Again was the third film version of Resurrection in seven years. It had been made as a silent film, under its original title, in 1927, and again under its original title, as an early talkie starring John Boles in 1931. The story has not been made into a theatrical film version in English since We Live Again.

Reception
The film was a box office disappointment.

References

External links
 
 
 

1934 films
1934 romantic drama films
American black-and-white films
Films directed by Rouben Mamoulian
American romantic drama films
Films set in the 19th century
Films set in Russia
Universal Pictures films
Films based on Resurrection
Samuel Goldwyn Productions films
1930s American films